Young model is a radio propagation model that was built on the data collected on New York City. It typically models the behaviour of cellular communication systems in large cities.

Applicable to/under conditions
This model is ideal for modeling the behaviour of cellular communications in large cities with tall structures.

Coverage
Frequency: 150 MHz to 3700 MHz

History
Young model was built on the data of 1952 in New York City.

Mathematical formulation
The mathematical formulation for Young model is:

Where,
L =  path loss. Unit: decibel (dB)
GB = gain of base transmitter. Unit: decibel (dB)
GM = gain of mobile transmitter. Unit: decibel (dB)
hB = height of base station antenna. Unit: meter (m)
hM = height of mobile station antenna. Unit: meter (m)
d = link distance. Unit: kilometer (km)
 = clutter factor

See also
Hata model
Log-distance path loss model

Radio frequency propagation model